Krystyna Chojnowska-Liskiewicz (15 July 1936 – 13 June 2021) was a Polish naval engineer and sailor as well as the first woman to have sailed single-handed (i.e. solo) around the world, repeating the accomplishment of Joshua Slocum. She sailed from the Canary Islands on 28 March 1976, and returned there on 21 April 1978, completing a circumnavigation of 31,166 nautical miles (57,719 km) in 401 days.

The boat 
Krystyna Chojnowska-Liskiewicz carried out her westabout (east to west) voyage on Mazurek, a Conrad 32 sloop built in Poland.  Mazurek was 9.51 metres (31.2 ft) long, with a beam of 2.70 metres (8.86 ft) and a sail area of 35 square metres (376.7 ft²).  Mazurek's construction team was headed by Chojnowska-Liskiewicz's husband.

The voyage 
She set sail from the Canary Islands on 28 February 1976, crossing the Atlantic Ocean to Barbados.  She then sailed through the Caribbean Sea to the Panama Canal, and hence to the Pacific Ocean.

After crossing the Pacific, Chojnowska-Liskiewicz sailed via Tahiti and Fiji to Australia, and then west across the Indian Ocean via Mauritius.  After passing the Cape of Good Hope, she sailed north, and crossed her outbound track on 20 March 1978 at latitude 16° 08.5' north and longitude 35° 50' west.

Chojnowska-Liskiewicz completed her voyage when she entered the port of Las Palmas de Gran Canaria on 21 April 1978, having sailed  in 401 days.  On 18 June 1978, she returned to Poland, where she is still seen as something of a national hero.

Other contenders for the title 
In completing her voyage, Chojnowska-Liskiewicz only narrowly beat Naomi James, who completed her own single-handed circumnavigation on 8 June 1978.  James' voyage is itself notable, however; she completed a fast (although not non-stop) circumnavigation in just 272 days, thus improving on Sir Francis Chichester's solo round-the-world sailing record by two days.  She also became the first woman to single-handedly sail the clipper route, eastabout and south of the three great capes, starting and finishing in the English Channel (a requirement for speed records).

In 1988, Kay Cottee of Australia became the first woman to complete a non-stop single-handed circumnavigation, on Blackmore's First Lady.

Orders 
  Polonia Restituta Commander's Cross

References

Bibliography 
  Krystyna Chojnowska-Liskiewicz - Polish Sailing Encyclopedia

External links
  Information on the yacht Mazurek - Polish Sailing Encyclopedia

1936 births
Polish female sailors (sport)
Single-handed circumnavigating sailors
2021 deaths
Sportspeople from Warsaw
People from Ostróda